The theory of knowledge, or epistemology, is a branch of philosophy.

 Theory of knowledge (IB course), a course subject in the IB programme
 Theory of Knowledge, a book by Roderick Chisholm